Udagama is a village in the Divisional Secretary's Division of Padukka, Western Province, Sri Lanka.

Populated places in Colombo District